The Tartar is one of the tributaries of the Kura located in Azerbaijan. It passes through the districts of Kalbajar, Barda and Tartar. Parts of the river flows through the self-proclaimed Republic of Artsakh's Martakert Province.

Overview

Tartar is the left tributary of Kura, the largest river in the Caucasus. The river originates in the area where Qonqur, Alaköz and Mıxtökən mountain ranges meet on Karabakh Plateau in the vicinity of hot springs village of Istisu located de jure in Kalbajar Rayon of Azerbaijan and de facto in the Martakert Province of the Republic of Artsakh.
The river flows eastward through the whole Kalbajar rayon (de facto Martakert Province) passing through Kalbajar city, Tartar and Barda raions passing
through Tartar and Barda cities before discharging into Kura. The river has two left tributaries: Levçay
() and Ağdabançay, and one right tributary Turağayçay. Sarsang reservoir was built on Tartar river in 1976 for electricity and irrigation purposes.

Statistical information
Tartarchay is considered one of the water-rich tributaries of Kura within Azerbaijani territory. The water volumes are sourced from rainfall (14%), snow (28%) and underground waters (58%). During spring and summer months, the snow melting in the mountains causes floods making up 65–70% of the annual water flow. In August and September, the water levels decrease. From October until November, the rainfall increases the water levels again. Average annual flow is 693.8 million m3. The average mineralization of the river is 300–500 mg/L with hydrocarbons and calcium.

Water uses
What was once the famous resort village of Istisu ( in Azerbaijani), which was occupied and ruined following the First Nagorno-Karabakh War, is located on the lower part of the river. The resort contains both natural drinking mineral water and hot water spring for bathing. Sarsang Hydro Power Plant with capacity of 50 megawatt is operated at the Sarsang reservoir of the river and is the main source of electric energy for the Republic of Artsakh (40–60%).

See also
Rivers and lakes in Azerbaijan
Qarqar River

References

Rivers of Azerbaijan
Tartar District
Kalbajar District
Barda District
Rivers of the Republic of Artsakh
Martakert Province